In enzymology, a glutamate—tRNAGln ligase is an enzyme that catalyzes the chemical reaction

ATP + L-glutamate + tRNAGlx  AMP + diphosphate + glutamyl-tRNAGlx

The 3 substrates of this enzyme are ATP, L-glutamate, and tRNAGlx, whereas its 3 products are AMP, diphosphate, and glutamyl-tRNAGlx.

This enzyme belongs to the family of ligases, to be specific those forming carbon-oxygen bonds in aminoacyl-tRNA and related compounds.  The systematic name of this enzyme class is L-glutamate:tRNAGlx ligase (AMP-forming). This enzyme is also called glutamyl-tRNA synthetase.  This enzyme participates in glutamate metabolism.

References

 
 
 

EC 6.1.1
Enzymes of unknown structure